Yerko Mauricio Águila Bastías (born 31 May 1996) is a Chilean footballer who plays for Deportes Temuco.

References

1996 births
Living people
Chilean footballers
Chilean Primera División players
Deportes Temuco footballers
Association football midfielders